Gegeneophis seshachari, the Seshachari's caecilian, is a species of caecilian found in the Western Ghats of India. It is only known from its type locality Dorle village, Ratnagiri district in Maharashtra.

References

seshachari
Endemic fauna of the Western Ghats
Amphibians of India
Amphibians described in 2003